Villanova d'Asti is a town and comune in the province of Asti, Piedmont, northern Italy. It has around 5,000 inhabitants. The economy is based on a mixture of agriculture and industry.

Villanova d'Asti was founded in the Middle Ages.

The main sight is the sanctuary of the Beata Vergine delle Grazie

Twin towns — sister cities
Villanova d'Asti is twinned with:

  Châteaurenard, France, since 1994
  Santa Clara de Saguier, Argentina, since 2012

References

Official website 

Cities and towns in Piedmont